Heilig Hüsli (Holy house) is a bridge chapel in Rapperswil, Canton of St. Gallen, Switzerland.

Geography 
The chapel is located next to the Seedamm, near the Rapperswil railway station. It is situated on a small island on upper Lake Zürich (Obersee) off of the Holzbrücke Rapperswil-Hurden, a historical wooden bridge that was  reconstructed in 2001.

During formation of the Alps, layers of sediment were deposited by ancient bodies of water. This gave rise to the banded rocks that form the Lindenhof hill in Rapperswil, and the islands of Ufnau, Lützelau and Heilighüsli. During the last Ice Age the island was under a thick layer of ice. Over time, only the harder layers of conglomerate rock and sandstone remained after the erosion by the glacier, creating the islands.

History 
The chapel, built near the former medieval wooden bridge between Rapperswil and Hurden, was first mentioned in 1485 AD as a wooden prayer house or pilgrim's chapel. The pilgrimage route Jakobsweg (Way of St. James) leads through the region, from Wattwil over the Ricken Pass to Schmerikon on to Lachen and Buechberg, along the left bank of the upper lake to St. Meinrad Pass, or from Schmerikon along Obersee, passing Bollingen, Wurmsbach and Jona-Busskirch to Rapperswil and then crossing the wooden bridge towards Hurden. Another route leads over the Hörnli mountain through the Töss Valley, passing the former Rüti Abbey via Kempraten and Rapperswil and the wooden bridge to the St. Meinrad Pass towards the Einsiedeln Abbey.

According to an inscription, the present stone building dates back to 1551. The chapel became the site of an execution after a legal dispute over a pasture belonging to the Wydenchlösterli, a nunnery on the shore of the Jona River. The Wydenchlösterli was a small Beguine nunnery founded by the House of Rapperswil. In the years before the Reformation in Zürich, its last superior, Katharine Scheuchzer (Katharina Schüchter) fought that the nunnery should be dissolved, and asked the neighboring Rüti Abbey and the Old Swiss Confederacy for support. When an epidemic in the Rapperswil hospital broke out in 1563, Scheuchzer was accused of witchcraft.<ref>"...schantlichs leben und hushan, mit huren und buben husghan, darzu jr dz almusen zu Rüti. Stadtarchiv Rapperswil, A VIIa 1.</ref> Although the Tagsatzung's verdict of 1543 was in favor of the small nunnery, after cruel torture, the old woman was sentenced by the town council to death, put in a bag, and drowned in the Obersee lake at Heilig Hüsli chapel. The property of the nunnery was transferred to the hospital.

After the Seedamm was built in 1878, the Heilig Hüsli chapel was the only remaining structure of the original medieval wooden bridge. It stood isolated in the lake and was not accessible to visitors until the reconstruction of the former wooden bridge was completed in 2001.

 Architecture 
It has a west-facing apse, in which a miraculous fresco was once installed. The altarpiece, whose outlines are still visible in the interior, is preserved together with a representation of the Virgin Mary with the body of Christ in the Stadtmuseum Rapperswil-Jona. The fresco was replaced by a replica by the Swiss artist Marlies Pekarek, and was inaugurated and blessed on 7 April 2011 with the intention of returning the bridge chapel to its original purpose. The interior of the chapel is visible only through the latticed east side. Following an old custom, pilgrims throw coins into the interior.

As of today the small chapel is owned by the Ortsgemeinde (citizenry's community) Rapperswil. The chapel was partially renovated in 1908, 1930, 1957, 2011 and 2015.

 Cultural heritage 
The chapel is under protection since 1907 and the building itself is listed in the Swiss inventory of cultural property of national and regional significance as an object of regional importance. Additionally, the site of the chapel is part of the Seedamm preservation area, along with the remains of the prehistoric wooden bridges and stilt house settlements at Rapperswil-Jona-Technikum''.

References

External links 

Churches in the canton of St. Gallen
Buildings and structures in Rapperswil-Jona
Roman Catholic chapels in Switzerland
Islands of Lake Zurich
Lake islands of Switzerland
16th-century Roman Catholic church buildings in Switzerland
Buildings and structures completed in 1551
1551 establishments in the Holy Roman Empire
Cultural property of regional significance in the canton of St. Gallen
Tourist attractions in Rapperswil-Jona
Gothic architecture in Switzerland